Cardigan may refer to:

Music
 The Cardigans, a Swedish pop group
 "Cardigan" (song), a 2020 song by Taylor Swift from Folklore
 "Cardigan", a 2020 song by Don Toliver from Heaven or Hell

Places
 Cardigan, Victoria, a region in Australia
 Cardigan, Prince Edward Island, Canada
 Cardigan (electoral district), an electoral district in Prince Edward Island
 Cardigan, Ceredigion, Wales
 Cardigan (UK Parliament constituency)
 Cardigan Castle
 Cardigan Island, a small uninhabited island north of Cardigan, Ceredigion
 Mount Cardigan, a mountain in New Hampshire, U.S.

Other uses
 Cardigan (sweater), a type of knitted open-front garment
 Cardigan (film), a lost 1922 silent film based on a novel by Robert W. Chambers
 Earl of Cardigan, a title in the Peerage of England
 James Brudenell, 7th Earl of Cardigan, British general during the Crimean War after whom the sweater is named
 SS Bury Hill or SS Cardigan, a British steamship

See also

 Cardigan Welsh Corgi, a breed of dog
 Cardiganshire, a historic county in Wales